Clear Lake is a lake in the U.S. state of Washington.

Clear Lake was so named on account of the clear character of its water.

References

Lakes of Thurston County, Washington